The C.P. Quattlebaum Office is a historic law office building located at Conway in Horry County, South Carolina. It was built about 1860 as a residence. It was used as a law office for the firm Johnson, Johnson, and Quattlebaum after 1876 until 1929. It also housed the first bank in town; The Bank of Conway, from 1893 until 1899.  It was moved to its present location about 1900.

It is a rectangular, front gable roofed, one-room wide and two-room deep weatherboard-clad building.  The façade features a three bay, hipped roof porch supported by square posts. Its owner, Cephas Perry Quattlebaum, served as Conway's first mayor and his residence is located nearby, the C.P. Quattlebaum House. The building is now used as the Conway Visitor's Center.

It was listed on the National Register of Historic Places in 1986.

References

External links
Quattlebaum, C. P., Office - Conway, South Carolina - U.S. National Register of Historic Places on Waymarking.com

Office buildings on the National Register of Historic Places in South Carolina
Buildings and structures in Conway, South Carolina
Commercial buildings completed in 1860
National Register of Historic Places in Horry County, South Carolina
Law offices
1860s establishments in South Carolina
Legal history of South Carolina
Relocated buildings and structures in South Carolina